Moçâmedes is a city in southwestern Angola.

Moçâmedes may also refer to:

 Moçâmedes, the former name of Namibe Province, Angola
 Mossâmedes, a small city in the state of Goiás, Brazil

See also
 Moçâmedes Desert, an Angolan desert near the border with Namibia
 Moçâmedes Railway, an Angolan railway line between Moçâmedes and Menongue